Mark Miller (born Claude Herbert Miller Jr.; November 20, 1924 – September 9, 2022) was an American stage and television actor and writer who starred in over 30 plays and made more than forty appearances in television programs and films since 1953. He is best known for his roles as Bill Hooten in Guestward, Ho!, as Jim Nash in the Please Don't Eat the Daisies TV series and as Alvie in the movie he wrote and produced, Savannah Smiles.

Early life and career

Miller was born in Houston, Texas. He graduated from New York's American Academy of Dramatic Arts in 1952. After graduation he was immediately cast in the revival of The Philadelphia Story in Newport, Rhode Island, at the Casino Playhouse and began a long-lasting career acting on stage and in television. He co-starred with Joanne Dru and J. Carrol Naish in the 1960–61 ABC sitcom Guestward, Ho!, the story of a New York City family named "Hooten" who relocates to New Mexico to operate a dude ranch.

Miller guest-starred in numerous series, including NBC's Western The Tall Man, with Barry Sullivan and Clu Gulager. He had a role in the film Youngblood Hawke (1964), and appeared on Jack Lord's ABC rodeo adventure series, Stoney Burke.

[[File:Mark Miller Patricia Crowley Please Dont Eat the Daisies 1966.JPG|middle|thumb|Miller and Pat Crowley in Please Don't Eat the Daisies (1966)]]
In 1965-66, he portrayed college professor Jim Nash, the leading role opposite Patricia Crowley, on the NBC-MGM television sitcom Please Don't Eat the Daisies, loosely based on the theatrical film starring Doris Day and David Niven. 

He played various roles in numerous other television shows, including The Millionaire, Gunsmoke, Marcus Welby, M.D., The Andy Griffith Show, General Hospital and I Dream Of Jeannie. From 1969 to 1970, Miller played the role of sidekick Ross Craig in NBC's The Name of the Game. He starred in a 1962 episode of Alfred Hitchcock Presents titled "Apex" in which he plays a philandering husband intent on killing his wife. In 1973, he appeared in the episode "Death by Prescription" of Lorne Greene's ABC crime drama Griff. 

The following year he wrote, produced and appeared in the film Ginger in the Morning, starring Sissy Spacek. He appeared in the feature films Mr. Sycamore (1975) and Dixie Dynamite (1976).

Miller produced and starred in the 1982 movie Savannah Smiles, for which he also wrote the story and screenplay. He starred alongside Slim Pickens in Christmas Mountain (1981).

Personal life and death
In December 1959, Miller married costume designer and publicist Beatrice Hudson Ammidown, daughter of architect Henry Philip Ammidown and Beatrice Hudson Embiricos .The couple had three daughters together: Marisa Miller, Penelope Ann and Savannah Miller. The two older girls both became actors. The curly blonde hair of youngest daughter Savannah gave Miller the initial idea for the movie Savannah Smiles, and she ended up having a small role in it as well. The couple divorced in 1975.

Miller remarried in 1976, to actress Barbara Stanger. The two co-wrote the screenplay for the 1995 film A Walk in the Clouds, starring Keanu Reeves and Anthony Quinn, and directed by Alfonso Arau. The couple divorced in 1998. Miller had six  grandchildren.

Miller retired from Hollywood in the late 1990s and moved to Taos, New Mexico, with Stanger. In 2010, he wrote the play Amorous Crossings'', that starred Loretta Swit and premiered at the Alhambra Theater in Jacksonville, Florida.  The play ran for four weeks to sold-out audiences. In 2014, he moved back to Los Angeles, where he formed the production company Gypsy Moon Entertainment, and he continued to write and sell screenplays.

Miller died in Santa Monica on September 9, 2022, at the age of 97.

Filmography

References

External links

Mark Miller profile on TVGuide.com

1924 births
2022 deaths
American male television actors
American male film actors
American television writers
American male screenwriters
Male actors from Houston
Male actors from Los Angeles
American male television writers
Screenwriters from Texas
Screenwriters from California
American Academy of Dramatic Arts alumni
American producers
American male stage actors